Pruner is a surname. Notable people with the surname include:

 Alexandra Pruner, American business executive
 Franz Ignaz Pruner (1808–1882), German physician, ophthalmologist, and anthropologist 
 James Dean Pruner (1951–1987 or 1988), American artist 
 Karl Pruner, Canadian actor

Occupational surnames